For the publisher and activist see Buzz Johnson

Norris Johnson (1898 - 1971) was an actress in silent films in the U.S. She had supporting roles in various films and also had lead roles in Thomas H. Ince and Samuel Goldwyn productions.

Filmography
What's Your Husband Doing? (1920)
Paris Green (1920)
An Amateur Devil (1920)
Let's Be Fashionable (1920), as Betty Turner
What's Your Husband Doing? (1920), as Helen Widgast
The Speed Girl (1921)
The New Disciple (1921)
Lorna Doone (1922) as Ruth
Dusk to Dawn (1922) as Babette
The Scarlet Car (1923) as Violet Gaynor
The White Sin (1924) as Grace's Aunt

References

External links
IMDb page

1898 births
1971 deaths
American silent film actresses
20th-century American actresses